Eremobastis is a genus of moths of the family Noctuidae.

Species
 Eremobastis fulva (Rothschild, 1914)

References
Natural History Museum Lepidoptera genus database
Eremobastis at funet

Hadeninae